The King of the Two Day Wonder is a 1979 Australian film. It was directed by Kevin Anderson, and starred Walter Dobrowolski and Sigrid Thornton. Anderson's first dramatic film, it was made with a low budget over a period of four years. It was screened at the 1978 Chicago International Film Festival, (where it was nominated for a Gold Hugo Award.) and the Mannheim International Film Festival in 1978.

Plot
A writer of pulp detective novels has trouble finishing his latest book. The film follows him through a creative dilemma.

Cast
Walter Dobrowolski as Robert Damien / Blake
Sigrid Thornton as Christy
Allen Bickford as Barry
James Robertson as Assassin
Maureen O'Loughlin as Ondine

Reception
The film was not a commercial success. It has been noted for technical sophistication and creative cinematography, but criticized for being overly stylistic.

References

External links

King of the Two Day Wonder at National Film and Sound Archive
Facebook page for the film

1979 films
Australian independent films
1970s English-language films
1970s Australian films